Farewell to the Father is a 2016 Australian memoir written by journalist Tim Elliott. It deals with his childhood experiences with his father, who suffered from mental illness. The book has its origins in an article in the Sydney Morning Herald's Good Weekend magazine.

References

Australian memoirs